DonationCoder.com is a website hosting a community of programmers and software fans. It supports a donation-based model to organize and finance software development, and is one example of Donationware.

The community develops and finances its own free software, software reviews, podcasts, and a diverse programming school.  Funding is accomplished using a grant-like system of micro-donations.  All donors to the site receive their donation back as DonationCredits which they can then trade amongst themselves to support different projects and reward activities contributing to the community.  All members are considered equal and simply donate an amount they feel comfortable with.

The community also fosters collaboration on free services, programming contests, and academic projects.

The site has an active forum which focuses on developments in software. DonationCoder has been recognized by Lifehacker, Ghacks and other well-known and reputable blogs for its adherence to the principles of freeware and open source software. Many well-regarded utilities have been produced by the coders that frequent DonationCoder.com, especially during the annual New Apps for the New Year (N.A.N.Y.) event and competitions.

Most of the software developed and discussed on the site are for Microsoft Windows, even though the developments in other platforms are followed.

See also

Gift economy
Participatory organization
Donationware

References

External links

DonationCoder Software Blog
DonationCoder Forum
Long article describing the experience of this website's first year
Lifehacker.com Column on DonationCoder
gHacks.net Column on DonationCoder

Community websites
Knowledge markets